Behr is a given name and surname that derives from the German Bär (bear). Older forms of the name, Bela and Belo (related to the old High German Belo), occur in the Memorbuch. The diminutive forms Baeril (Berel) and Baerush (Berush) are used among Polish and Russian Jews.

An additional origin of the name is from Middle Dutch baer meaning naked or bare, possibly indicating someone who wore rags.

Given name
 Behr Perlhefter (1650–1713), Jewish scholar and rabbi

Surname
 Barbara Behr, photographer, film director and magazine editor
 Bernd Behr (born 1976), German artist
 Bill Behr (1919–1997), American professional basketball player
 Bram Behr (1951–1982), Surinamese journalist
 Carel Jacobus Behr (1812–1895), Dutch painter, watercolorist and draftsman
 Carl Behr (1874–1943), German ophthalmologist
 Carlos Boloña Behr (1950–2018), Peruvian politician
 Christoph Behr (born 1989), German footballer
 Dani Behr (born 1971), British television presenter and singer
 Edgar Behr (1910–1985), German sailor
 Emilio Behr (1995), Dutch DJ, record producer and musician known by his stage name Justin Mylo
 Felicia Minei Behr (born 1942), American television producer and network executive
 Franz Behr (1837–1898), German composer
 Giorgio Behr (born 1948), Swiss businessman and professor
 Hans Hermann Behr (1818–1904), German-American botanist and entomologist
 Ira Steven Behr (born 1953), American television producer and scriptwriter
 James Behr, American pianist, composer, recording artist and educator
 Jason Behr (born 1973), American actor
 Jean-Paul Behr (born 1947), French chemist
 Johann Behr (1655–1700), an Austrian author, court official and composer
 John Behr (born 1966), British Eastern Orthodox priest and theologian
 Julia Behr, German portrait painter
 Kaelyn Behr, birth name of Styalz Fuego, an Australian music producer, vocalist and songwriter
 Karl Behr (1885–1949), American tennis player, banker, and survivor of the sinking of RMS Titanic
 Kurt von Behr (born 1945), head of Einsatzstab Reichsleiter Rosenberg in France; see Bruno Lohse
 Mark Behr (1963–2015), South African author
 Matthias Behr (born 1955), German foil fencer.
 Noam Behr (born 1975), tennis player
 Ottomar von Behr (1810–1856), German-American meteorologist and naturalist
 Pamela Behr (born 1956), retired German alpine ski racer
 Paul Behr, recipient of the Knight's Cross of the Iron Cross
 Peter H. Behr (1915–1997), California State Senator and lawyer
 Rafael Behr, a columnist at The Guardian, since 2014, and former political editor at the New Statesman
 Reinhold Behr (born 1948), German fencer
 Sepp Behr (born 1931), German Olympic alpine skier
 Therese Behr (1876–1959), German contralto (married name: Schnabel)
 Victor de Behr, Belgian athlete whose main event was water polo
 William Joseph Behr (1775–1851), German writer
 Winrich Behr (1918–2011), German soldier

See also 
 Baer, a surname
 Baehr, a surname
 Bahr (surname)
 Baire or René-Louis Baire (1874–1932), a French mathematician
 Edward Behr (disambiguation)

References 

German-language surnames
Surnames from nicknames